Soligalich is a town and the administrative center of Soligalichsky District in Kostroma Oblast, Russia, located on the right bank of the Kostroma River. Population:

History
It originated as an important center of saltworks, which supplied with salt not only Russia but also much of Scandinavia. These saltworks were first mentioned in the testament of Ivan Kalita as Sol-Galitskaya (lit. salt of Galich).

By the end of the 14th century, the saltworks passed to the family of Dmitry Shemyaka, providing him with income required to wage prolonged wars for control of Moscow. It was in 1450 that both Galich and Soligalich were finally seized by Vasily II of the Grand Duchy of Moscow.

In the 16th century, the saltworks were exploited by the Trinity Lavra of St. Sergius and five other monasteries. The settlement was repeatedly ravaged by Kazan Tatars and Udmurts.

In 1609, Soligalich became a voivode's seat. It was sacked by one of Polish units roaming Russia during the Time of Troubles. In 1649, the wooden town was destroyed by fire. Towards the end of the 17th century, half a dozen churches were rebuilt in brick, surviving to the present day.

In 1708, Soligalich became a part of Archangelgorod Governorate. Seven decades later, separate Kostroma Governorate was formed, with Soligalich as one of the uyezd centers.

Administrative and municipal status
Within the framework of administrative divisions, Soligalich serves as the administrative center of Soligalichsky District. As an administrative division, it is incorporated within Soligalichsky District as the town of district significance of Soligalich. As a municipal division, the town of district significance of Soligalich is incorporated within Soligalichsky Municipal District as Soligalich Urban Settlement.

Tourism
The town is known as a minor spa, for it has mineral springs, silt and mud baths.

Notable people
Painter Grigory Ostrovsky was active in Soligalich; the only paintings known to be by his hand are currently held in the town's regional museum.

There is a monument to Gennady Nevelskoy, who was born in the vicinity.

Publisher Ivan Sytin was born in Soligalichsky District.

References

Notes

Sources

External links
 Unofficial website of Soligalich 
Small Towns of Russia. Entry on Soligalich 

Cities and towns in Kostroma Oblast
Soligalichsky District
Soligalichsky Uyezd
Spa towns in Russia